Ambient air quality criteria, or standards, are concentrations of pollutants in the air, and typically refer to outdoor air. The criteria are specified for a variety of reasons including for the protection of human health, buildings, crops, vegetation, ecosystems, as well as for planning and other purposes. There is no internationally accepted definition but usually "standards" have some legal or enforcement aspect, whereas "guidelines" may not be backed by laws.  "Criteria/criterion" can be used as a generic term to cover standards and guidelines.

Various organisations have proposed criteria e.g. WHO, EU, US EPA. These criteria are often similar - but not always, even if they are proposed for the same purpose (e.g. the protection of human health).

Specifying the criteria 
It is important for any numerical standard that averaging period, unit, and statistical measure are given (e.g. the 98th percentile of hourly means measured over a calendar year in micrograms per cubic metre (μg/m3)). Without these there is no common ground for a given criterion, making it confusing or even meaningless.  Criteria can be set in different units (e.g. μg/m3, parts per billion by volume (ppbv), parts per billion by mass (ppb (mass)), parts per million (ppm)) and it is possible to convert between all of these units if the molecular mass of the pollutant and the temperature are known. Different standard temperatures are used throughout the world and so it is important to state the temperature of conversion (if relevant). Most pollutants have ambient criteria in the parts per billion (ppb) or μg/m3 range. Some have smaller units (e.g. dioxins are often in pico grams /m3); others have larger units (e.g. carbon monoxide (CO) in mg/m3). Particle pollution (e.g. PM10, PM1.0) is specified in units of mass (e.g. μg/m3) and not in units of volume (ppmv).

In the EU, the pollutants and their criteria are specified in Directive 2008/50/EC.

The criteria 
Below is a list of available air quality criteria around the world. There is a lot of cross referencing between organizations (e.g. the International Finance Corp (IFC)) that have their own criteria but ultimately, many criteria are based on those specified by the World Health Organization (WHO). It is important when complying with ambient air quality criteria to check the direct reference as well. Not all related caveats/controlling parameters of a criterion can be put in the table, and therefore those specified below are mostly those that most monitoring agencies specify. These agencies also list whether criteria must be monitored in a specific way to fit with compliance measures.

Footnotes 
[1] Annual arithmetic mean of a minimum of 104 measurements in a year at a particular site, such as taken twice weekly as uniform 24-hour samples.

[2] 24/8/1 hourly monitored values, as applicable, shall be complied with 98% of the time, they may exceed the limits but not on two consecutive days of monitoring.

See also 

 National Ambient Air Quality Objectives for Canada

References

Pollution in the United States
Air pollution